Ghost of the Golden Groves is a critically acclaimed 2019 Indian Bengali-language Experimental  horror fantasy film directed by Aniket Dutta and Roshni Sen (known collectively as "Harun-Al-Rashid" after the caliph of the same name). The film consists of two stories, the second of which is loosely based on a short story by Bibhutibhushan Bandyopadhyay. The film stars Joyraj Bhattacharjee and Bibhuti Soumyajit Majumdar.

Ghost of the Golden Groves premiered on 22 June 2019 at the London Indian Film Festival. and in October at the Festival du nouveau Cinema Montreal where the film was nominated for the FIPRESCI(International Federation of Film Critics) award. In 2020, it won the top award at Chicago underground film festival

Cast
 Joyraj Bhattacharjee as Promotho
 Soumyajit Majumdar as Bibhuti
 Debleena Sen
 Bidyut Das as Komol Mete
 Jayanta Banerjee as Nibaran Chakraborty

Release
Ghost of the Golden Groves had its premiere on 22 June 2019 at the London Indian Film Festival. It later screened on 16 and 17 October 2019 at the Festival du nouveau cinéma in Canada. It had its USA premiere on March 5, 2020, at Cinequest and it went on to play at numerous film festivals.

Reception
Anton Bitel, in his review of the film for Sight & Sound, called it "Beautifully framed and shot [...] an elegant yet absurd diptych of supernatural tales whose odd parallels and asymptotic connections only add to their unsettling sense of illogic." J. Hurtado of Screen Anarchy called the film "a challenging watch, for sure. The pacing is a bit slow and the material is quite obtuse for the most part, making mainstream breakthrough a tough road. However, film fans who like to be challenged will find plenty to dissect and enjoy." J.Berra of Screen International wrote on VCINEMA that "Ghost of the Golden Groves is a true one-off" and listed it as one of the best Asian films of 2019.Senses of Cinema called it "a gateway into a wildly original artistic vision".

References
https://www.rapportoconfidenziale.org/?p=41983 Rapporto Confidenziale in conversation with Aniket Dutta and Roshni Sen

External links
 
 

2019 films
Bengali-language Indian films
Indian horror films
Indian fantasy films
Films set in Bengal
Films set in the 1960s